Petasidae is a family of cnidarians belonging to the order Trachymedusae.

Genera:
 Petasiella Uchida, 1947
 Petasus Haeckel, 1879

References

 
Trachymedusae
Cnidarian families